Jean Raspail (5 July 1925 – 13 June 2020) was a French author, traveler, and explorer. Many of his books are about historical figures, exploration and indigenous peoples. He was a recipient of the prestigious French literary awards Grand Prix du Roman and Grand Prix de littérature by the Académie française. The French government honoured him in 2003 by appointing him to the Legion of Honor, with the grade of Officer.  Internationally, he is best known for his controversial 1973 novel The Camp of the Saints, which is about mass third-world immigration to Europe.

Life and career
Born on 5 July 1925 in Chemillé-sur-Dême, Indre-et-Loire, Raspail was the son of factory manager Octave Raspail and Marguerite Chaix. He attended private Catholic school at Saint-Jean de Passy in Paris, the Institution Sainte-Marie d'Antony and the École des Roches in Verneuil-sur-Avre.

During the first twenty years of his career Raspail traveled the world. He led a Tierra del Fuego–Alaska car trek in 1950–52 and, in 1954, a French research expedition to the land of the Incas. Raspail served as Consul General of the Kingdom of Araucanía and Patagonia. In 1981, his novel Moi, Antoine de Tounens, roi de Patagonie (I, Antoine of Tounens, King of Patagonia) won the Grand Prix du Roman (award for a novel) of the Académie française.

His traditional Catholicism serves as an inspiration for many of his utopian works, in which the ideologies of communism and liberalism are shown to fail, and a Catholic monarchy is restored. In his 1990 novel Sire a French king is crowned in Reims in February 1999, the 18-year-old Philippe Pharamond de Bourbon, a direct descendant of the last French kings.

In his best known work, The Camp of the Saints (1973), Raspail predicts the collapse of Western civilization from an overwhelming "tidal wave" of Third World immigration. The "hordes" of the world rise and, in the words of playwright Ian Allen, "destroy the white race." The book has been translated into English, German, Spanish, Italian, Afrikaans, Czech, Dutch, Polish, Hungarian and Portuguese, and as of 2006 it had sold over 500,000 copies. After The Camp of the Saints Raspail wrote other novels, including North, Sire, and The Fisher's Ring. Raspail reiterated these views in a co-written 1985 article ("Will France Still Be French in 2015?") for Le Figaro magazine, where he stated "the proportion of France's non-European immigrant population will grow to endanger the survival of traditional French culture, values and identity".

Raspail was a candidate for the French Academy in 2000, for which he received the most votes, yet did not obtain the majority required for election to the vacant seat of Jean Guitton.

An article by Raspail for Le Figaro on 17 June 2004, entitled "The Fatherland Betrayed by the Republic", in which he criticized the French immigration policy, was sued by International League against Racism and Anti-Semitism on the grounds of "incitement to racial hatred", but the action was turned down by the court on 28 October.

In 1970, the Académie française awarded Raspail its Jean Walter Prize for the whole of his work. In 2007 he was awarded the Grande Médaille d’Or des Explorations et Voyages de Découverte by the Société de géographie of France for the whole of his work.

Personal life
He lived in Neuilly-sur-Seine, near Paris.

Works
 Terre de feu – Alaska (Land of Fire – Alaska) (1952) – adventure writing
 Terres et Peuples Incas (Inca Lands and Peoples) (1955)
 Le Vent des Pins (1958), translated as Welcome Honorable Visitors: a novel by Jean Stewart (Putnam, 1960)
 Terres Saintes et Profanes (Lands Holy and Profane) (1960)
 Les Veuves de Santiago (The Widows of Santiago) (1962)
 Hong-Kong, Chine en sursis (Hong Kong, A Reprieve for China) (1963)
 Secouons le cocotier (Let's Shake the Coconut Tree) (1966) – travel writing
 Secouons le cocotier : 2, Punch Caraïbe (Let's Shake the Coconut Tree 2: Caribbean Punch) (1970) – travel writing
 Bienvenue Honorables Visiteurs (le Vent des pins) (Welcome Honorable Visitors) (1970) – novel
 Le Tam-Tam de Jonathan (Jonathan's Drum) (1971) – nouvelles
 L'Armada de la Dernière Chance (Last-Chance Armada) (1972)
 Le Camp des Saints (1973), translated as The Camp of the Saints by Norman Shapiro (Scribner, 1975; The Social Contract Press, 1995) – novel
 La Hache des Steppes (The Steppes Axe) (1974)
 Journal Peau Rouge (Red Skin Journal) (1975)
 Nuage Blanc et les Peaux-Rouges d'aujourd'hui (White Cloud and the Redskins of Today) (1975) – by Aliette and Jean Raspail
 Le Jeu du Roi (The King's Game) (1976) – novel
 Boulevard Raspail (Raspail Boulevard) (1977) – columns
 Les Peaux-rouges aujourd'hui (Redskins Today) (1978)
 Septentrion (North) (1979), translated as Septentrion (Sunny Lou Publishing, 2022) – novel
 Bleu caraïbe et citrons verts : mes derniers voyages aux Antilles (Caribbean Blue and Green Lemons: My Last Trips to the Antilles) (1980)
 Les Antilles, d'île en île (The Antilles, From Island to Island) (1980)
 Moi, Antoine de Tounens, roi de Patagonie (I, Antoine of Tounens, King of Patagonia) (1981) – novel
 Les Hussards : histoires exemplaires (The Hussars: Representative Stories) (1982)
 Les Yeux d'Irène (Irene's Eyes) (1984) – novel
 Le Président (The President) (1985) – novel
 Qui se souvient des hommes... (1986), translated as Who Will Remember the People...: A Novel. Translated by J. Leggatt (Mercury House, 1988) – novel. UK paperback published under alternative title The People (1988).
 L'Île bleue (1988), translated by J. Leggatt as Blue Island: A Novel (Mercury House, 1991)
 Pêcheurs de Lune (Moon Fishers) (1990)
 Sire (Sire) (1990) – novel
 Vive Venise (Long Live Venice) (1992) – by Aliette and Jean Raspail
 Sept cavaliers quittèrent la ville au crépuscule par la porte de l'Ouest qui n'était plus gardée (Seven Riders Left the City at Dusk through the Western Gate, Which Was No Longer Guarded) (1993) – novel (commonly called Sept cavaliers...)
 L'Anneau du pêcheur (The Ring of the Fisherman) (1995) – novel
 Hurrah Zara ! (Hooray Zara!) (1998) – novel
 Le Roi au-delà de la mer (The King Over the Water) (2000) – novel
 Adiós, Tierra del Fuego (Goodbye, Tierra del Fuego) (2001) – travel writing
 Le son des tambours sur la neige et autres nouvelles d'ailleurs (The Sound of Drums on Snow, and Other News from Elsewhere) (2002)
 Les Royaumes de Borée (The Kingdoms of Borée) (2003) – novel
 En canot sur les chemins d'eau du roi, une aventure en Amérique (2005) – travel writing

Adaptations
 Le Roi de Patagonie (1990), TV mini-series directed by Georges Campana and Stéphane Kurc
 Le Jeu du roi (1991), TV film directed by Marc Evans
 L'Île bleue (2001), TV film directed by Nadine Trintignant
 Sept cavaliers (2008–2010), comic book in three volumes by Jacques Terpant
 Le Royaume de Borée (2011–2014), comic book in three volumes by Jacques Terpant

Quotations 
 “One cannot be a man, fully, from the moment one admits that others exist. For one is no more than a copy, a vague facsimile drawn from a billion examples. One mustnʼt know anything about others, or at least by ruthless choice, unless it is how to invent oneself on oneʼs own, – everything has been so repeated."

References 

1925 births
2020 deaths
Counter-revolutionaries
People from Indre-et-Loire
French explorers
French monarchists
20th-century French novelists
21st-century French novelists
French travel writers
Grand Prix du roman de l'Académie française winners
Prix du Livre Inter winners
Saint-Jean de Passy alumni
French anti-communists
French conspiracy theorists
French male novelists
French Roman Catholics
French Roman Catholic writers
Prix Maison de la Presse winners
Grand prix Jean Giono recipients
French science fiction writers
20th-century French male writers
21st-century French male writers
French male non-fiction writers
Anti-immigration activists